Sultana Zaman (9 June 1932 – 22 March 2020) was a Bangladeshi psychologist, academic, and philanthropist. She was the founder of Bangladesh Protibandhi Foundation (BPF), an organization for the mentally disabled people. She was awarded Begum Rokeya Padak in 2008 by the Government of Bangladesh.

Education and career
Zaman started her college education late in life, specializing in psychology and started working with the intellectually disabled in 1973. She completed her B.A. and M.A. degrees from the University of Dhaka. She earned her Ph.D. from Emory University in 1975. She as a faculty member in the psychology department of the University of Dhaka for 33 years and as a professor from 1975 to 2000. She was a visiting professor in the Department of Special Education at the University of Manchester for four months from April 1992. She was made Professor of Emeritus in September 2008 at the University of Dhaka.

Working with the disabled
In 1972, Zaman established a school, Deepshikha Vidyalaya for disadvantaged children and women. She founded an organization for the mentally disabled people, Bangladesh Protibandhi Foundation, and a school Kalyani in 1984. She helped establish the Department of Special Education at the Institute of Education and Research (IER) and the University of Dhaka in 1993 — the first of its kind at the university level in Bangladesh and the first of its kind to offer B.S.Ed. and M.S.Ed. degrees in special education.

Awards
 Henry H. Kessler Award (1996)
 Rotary International Award "Women for Women," 
 Anannya
 Bangladesh Scouts
 Autism Welfare Foundation (2000)
 IER Award (2003)
 Agradoot Award (2008)
 Begum Rokeya Padak (2008)

Personal life
Zaman was married to Bir Uttom Lieutenant colonel Kazi Nuruzzaman, the sector commander at the sector 7 of Bangladesh Liberation War. Her brother Jamal Nazrul Islam was a physicist.

Death 
Zaman died on 22 March 2020.

References

1932 births
2020 deaths
University of Dhaka alumni
Academic staff of the University of Dhaka
Emory University alumni
Bangladeshi psychologists
Bangladeshi women psychologists
Bangladeshi philanthropists
Recipients of Begum Rokeya Padak